The United States Parachute Association (USPA) is a private sports governing body for the sport of skydiving in the United States. Its headquarters are located in Fredericksburg, Virginia. The USPA's roots go back to the National Parachute Riggers-Jumpers, Inc., which was formed in the 1930s.

Functions

USPA performs the following functions:
 Issues sport skydiving licenses
 Publishes and maintains skydiving training manuals and course guidelines from which instructional ratings are issued
 Serves as legal advocate and political lobbyist for skydiving
 Provides third-party insurance for skydivers
 Maintains the Basic Safety Requirements (BSRs) as a set of voluntarily followed safety guidelines
 Coordinates skydiving competitions and awards
 Issues awards for longevity, skill and achievement
 Publishes Parachutist, a monthly magazine for members

In November 2020, USPA announced their plans for a National Skydiving Museum to be built in Central Florida, but didn't specify a timeframe for completion.

See also
 Canadian Sport Parachuting Association
 Parachute Industry Association
 Skydiving regulation in the United States

References

External links
 
Parachutist—USPA's member magazine

Non-profit organizations based in Fredericksburg, Virginia
Parachute Association
Parachuting organizations
Parachute Association
Sports organizations established in 1946
Sports in Northern Virginia
1946 establishments in New York (state)